Wayne August Wiegand (born April 15, 1946) is an American library historian, author, and academic. Wiegand retired as F. William Summers Professor of Library and Information Studies and Professor of American Studies at Florida State University in 2010.

Early life and  education
Wiegand received a BA in history at the University of Wisconsin–Oshkosh (1968), an MA in history at the University of Wisconsin–Milwaukee (1970), and an MLS at Western Michigan University and a Ph.D. in history at Southern Illinois University (1974).

Career
Wiegand was Librarian at Urbana College in Ohio (1974-1976), and on the faculties of the College of Library Science at the University of Kentucky from 1976 through 1986, and the School of Library and Information Studies at the University of Wisconsin–Madison from1987 through 2002. He moved to Florida State University in 2003. At the University of Wisconsin-Madison he served as founder and Co-Director of the Center for the History of Print Culture in Modern America (a joint program of the University and the Wisconsin Historical Society established in 1992).

He served as William Rand Kenan Jr. Visiting Professor at the University of North Carolina at Chapel Hill and as Fellow in the UW–Madison's Institute for Research in the Humanities. He was an elected member of the American Antiquarian Society and a Spencer Foundation Fellow. Between 2004 and 2007 he served as Executive Director of Beta Phi Mu (the International Library and Information Science Honor Society). Wiegand co-organized the Florida Book Awards as a member of the faculty of the FSU Program in American & Florida Studies.  For the academic year 2009-2010 he shared time between Florida State University in Tallahassee and the Winter Park Institute of Rollins College, where he was "Scholar in Residence."  In 2011 he received a Short-Term Fellowship from the New York Public Library.

Writing
From 2008-2009, he had a Fellowship from the National Endowment for the Humanities to write a book entitled 'Part of Our Lives:' A People's History of the American Public Library.  The book was published by Oxford University Press in 2015. Notable among library histories for its emphasis on user experience and the role of libraries as community institutions, the book has been described as a "landmark" in library history marked by "impassioned advocacy" and "solid scholarship".  The book precedes a documentary on the American public library (release expected in 2019) by independent film makers.

From January to May, 2017, he was distinguished visiting scholar at the Library of Congress's John W. Kluge Center, researching a book on the history of American public school librarianship.  It will appear as “American Public School Librarianship: A History” (Johns Hopkins University Press) in Fall, 2021.

In Spring, 2018, Louisiana State University Press published "The Desegregation of Public Libraries in the Jim Crow South:  Civil Rights and Local Activism," a book he coauthored with his wife, Shirley A. Wiegand. It was awarded the  2019 Eliza Atkins Gleason Book Award by the Library History Round Table of the American Library Association.

Personal life
Wiegand is married to Shirley A. Wiegand. They currently reside in Walnut Creek, California.

Bibliography
Books
"Part of Our Lives:  A People's History of the American Public Library." Oxford University Press, 2015 
 Main Street Public Library:  Community Places and Reading Spaces in the Rural Heartland, 1876-1956. University of Iowa Press, 2011. 
 Irrepressible Reformer: A Biography of Melvil Dewey. American Library Association, 1996.  
"An Active Instrument for Propaganda:" The American Public Library During World War I. Greenwood Press, 1989 
"Patrician in the Progressive Era:  A Biography of George von Lengerke Meyer." Garland Publishing, 1988.
"The Politics of An Emerging Profession:  The American Library Association, 1876-1917." Greenwood Press, 1986.
The History of a Hoax: Edmund Lester Pearson, John Cotton Dana, and the Old Librarian's Almanack. Beta Phi Mu. 1979. 
With Sarah Wadsworth, "Right Here I See My Own Books:" The Woman's Building Library at the World's Columbian Exposition. University of Massachusetts Press, 2012.   
With Shirley A. Wiegand; Books on Trial: Red Scare in the Heartland. University of Oklahoma Press, 2007. 
With Shirley A. Wiegand; "The Desegregation of Public Libraries in the Jim Crow South:  Civil Rights and Local Activism." Louisiana State University Press, 2018.

Edited Books
Leaders in American Academic Librarianship: 1925-1975. Beta Phi Mu, 1983.
Supplement to the Dictionary of American Library Biography. Libraries Unlimited Inc., 1990.
With Donald G. Davis, Jr., Encyclopedia of Library History. Garland, 1994.
With James P. Danky, Print Culture in a Diverse America. University of Illinois Press, 1998.   
With Thomas Augst; Libraries As Agencies Of Culture Print Culture History In Modern America. University of Wisconsin Press, 2002.   
With Anne Lundin, Defining Print Culture for Youth : The Cultural Work of Children's Literature. Libraries Unlimited, 2003.
With Diana Tixier Herald Genreflecting: A Guide to Popular Reading Interests, Sixth Edition. Libraries Unlimited, 2005. 
With James P. Danky Women in Print: Essays on the Print Culture of American Women from the Nineteenth and Twentieth Centuries. University of Wisconsin Press, 2006. 
With Pamela Spence Richards and Marija Dalbello, "A History of Modern Librarianship:  Constructing the Heritage of Cultures."  Libraries Unlimited, 2015.  .

References

1946 births
20th-century American historians
American male non-fiction writers
21st-century American historians
21st-century American male writers
American librarians
Florida State University faculty
Living people
People from Manitowoc County, Wisconsin
People from Walnut Creek, California
Southern Illinois University Carbondale alumni
University of Kentucky faculty
University of Wisconsin–Madison faculty
University of Wisconsin–Milwaukee alumni
University of Wisconsin–Oshkosh alumni
Western Michigan University alumni
Historians from California
Historians from Wisconsin
20th-century American male writers